Events in the year 1973 in Germany.

Incumbents
President – Gustav Heinemann 
Chancellor – Willy Brandt

Events
21 February – Germany in the Eurovision Song Contest 1973
1 March – Launch of the Volkswagen Passat, a large family hatchback based on the front-wheel drive running gear of the Audi 80. It is similar in concept to the Renault 16 from France and also competes with traditional saloons like the Ford Taunus and Opel Ascona.
30 May – Chancellor Brandt is briefed on the espionage activities of his aide, Günter Guillaume.
22 June–3 July – 23rd Berlin International Film Festival
18 September – The two German Republics, the Federal Republic of Germany (West Germany) and the German Democratic Republic (East Germany), are admitted to the United Nations.
11 December – Treaty of Prague
 Date unknown: German company Gerry Weber was founded.

Births
26 January – Jörn Weisbrodt, German arts administrator 
24 February – Philipp Rösler, politician and physician (official date)
8 April – Christof May, theologian and priest (died 2022)
22 April – Max Herre, singer
28 April – Elisabeth Röhm, actress
1 May – Mike Jesse, footballer
2 May – Florian Henckel von Donnersmarck, film director
20 May – Kaya Yanar, comedian
1 June – Heidi Klum, model, television host, businesswoman, fashion designer and television producer
22 June – Sonya Kraus, actress
24 June – Alexander Beyer, actor
28 June – Andre Lange, German Olympic bobsledder
15 July - Yasemin Şamdereli, actress
14 August – Thyra von Westernhagen, German noblewoman and landowner
25 August – Fatih Akin, German film director, screenwriter and producer
10 September – Deniz Yücel, German journalist
1 October – Devid Striesow, German actor
2 December – Jan Ullrich, German professional road bicycle racer
28 December – Marc Blume, German sprinter

Deaths
 2 February - Max Brauer, German politician (born 1887)
 11 February - J. Hans D. Jensen, German nuclear physicist (born 1907)
 10 March — Robert Siodmak, German film director (born 1900)
 20 March — Adolf Strauss, German general (born 1879)
 8 April — Viktor de Kowa, German actor and singer (born 1904)
 7 May — Walter von Keudell, German politician (born 1884)
 26 May — Karl Löwith, German philosopher (born 1897)
 28 May – Hans Schmidt-Isserstedt, German conductor and composer (born 1900)
 8 June – Emmy Göring, German actress (born 1893)
 9 June – Erich von Manstein, German commander of the Wehrmacht (born 1887)
 18 June — Theodor Krancke, Kriegsmarine admiral and Knight's Cross recipient (born 1893)
 26 June — Hans Schlemmer, Wehrmacht general and Knight's Cross recipient (born 1893)
 2 July – Ferdinand Schörner, German field marshal (born 1892)
 7 July – Max Horkheimer, German philosopher and sociologist (born 1895)
 13 July – Willy Fritsch, German actor (born 1901)
 6 July – Otto Klemperer, German conductor (born 1885)
 1 August – Walter Ulbricht, East German politician (born 1893)
 12 August – Karl Ziegler (1898-1973), chemist, Nobel Prize in Chemistry laureate (born 1898)
 15 September – Herbert Albert, conductor (born 1903)
 10 October — Hermann Reinecke, Wehrmacht general and convicted war criminal (born 1888)
 14 December – Josef Magnus Wehner, German poet and playwright (born 1891)

See also
 1973 in German television

References

 
Years of the 20th century in Germany
1970s in Germany
Germany
Germany